Marc Silk is a British voice actor.

His character vocal work includes Aks Moe in Star Wars: Episode I – The Phantom Menace, Danger Mouse, The Pingu Show, Go Jetters, Strange Hill High, Chicken Run and US voice of Bob in Bob the Builder.

He provided the voice of Johnny Bravo in bumpers aired on Cartoon Network UK and Ireland. He has also voiced Scooby-Doo and Shaggy in voice work for both Cartoon Network UK and Ireland and the CITV channel.

Filmography

Film 
 Star Wars: Episode I – The Phantom Menace – Aks Moe (voice); Sil Unch (voice)
 Chicken Run – Chickens

Animation

 Cartoon Network UK & Ireland – Johnny Bravo (Silk played the character in bumpers, when Johnny "hosted" the "Toon FM" programming block on the channel) along with Brak from Space Ghost Coast to Coast, who was voiced by Dan Russell (who currently voices Richard Watterson in The Amazing World of Gumball).
 Cartoon Network, Boomerang, CITV – Scooby-Doo and Shaggy (voice work for the UK and Ireland versions of the respective channels)
 Danger Mouse (2015 reboot) – Nero; over 30 other characters
 Go Jetters – Grandmaster Glitch; Grimbots (BBC)
Bitz & Bob - Zip (BBC / Boat Rocker Media)
 The Pingu Show – Narrator (BBC/HiT Entertainment)
 Bob the Builder – Bob; Mr. Beasley; Bristle (US)
 Strange Hill High – multiple characters (BBC)
 Roary the Racing Car – Flash; Maxi; Drifter; Hellie; Nick; Copter Keith (UK); Conrod (US); Dinkie (UK/US)
 Fifi and the Flowertots – Bumble; Slugsy; Diggly (UK/US)
 The Lingo Show – Lingo (BBC)
 Chop Socky Chooks (Aardman / Cartoon Network)
 Legend of the Dragon – Xuan Chi
 Pitt & Kantrop – Prosper; Mandas
 Albie (Cosgrove Hall Films)
 Boblins – Yam Yam; Bodkin; Ruddle; Pi
 Odd Jobbers – Bitz; Bob; Osimo
 Rocky and the Dodos – Bill Bartender; Rocky (Cosgrove Hall Films)
 Zoo Troop – Rory the Tiger; Bradley Bear; Greedy the Gorilla
 Cubeez – Additional voices
 Thunderbirds Are Go – Captain Wayne Rigby
 Shane The Chef - Sam

Vocal Coach

 Share A Story – multiple BAFTA award-winning production (Children's ITV)

Shorts

 This Way Up – Undertaker (Academy Award-nominated)
 Don't Fear Death – Various voices

Television shows – announcer 
 The Royal Variety Show
 British Comedy Awards
 An Evening With Take That (2017)
 It'll Be Alright on the Night
 Ant & Dec's Saturday Night Takeaway
 The Paul O'Grady Show
 You've Been Framed
 A Comedy Roast
 Popstar to Operastar
 Dancing on Ice
 We Are Most Amused – Prince Charles' 60th Birthday
 An Audience with Neil Diamond
 An Audience with Barry Manilow – 2011
 Disney Channel - Promo announcer

Video games 
 Black & White –  Good and Evil consciences; Various (Lionhead / EA Games)
 Micro Machines World Series – Codemasters
 F1 2016 – Codemasters
 F1 Race Stars – Various
 Overlord – Gnarl; Minions; Various
 MediEvil 2 – Winston Chapelmount
 Buzz! Master Quiz (PS3 / PSP)
 TV Superstars (PS3)
 Scene It - Doctor Who
 40 Winks – Nitekap; Threadbear; Robot Ruff
 Hogs of War – Monty; Ponsonby; Jones; Gerard; M. Chien; Cochon; Goinfre; Glouton; Huski; Jetski; Snowski; Pesski; Muski; Rimski; Kendo; Kung Fu; Ninja; Sushi; Kempo; Tenko; Wolfie; Lederhos; Herr Gel; Schnitzel; Schwein; All nine Americans
 Gex 3: Deep Cover Gecko – Alfred
 Chicken Run – Rocky
 PlayStation All-Stars Battle Royale – Spike; Specter; Narrator (MediEvil); Nick
 DmC: Devil May Cry – Various additional characters
 LittleBigPlanet 2 – Superman
 LittleBigPlanet PS Vita – Superman
 Tom and Jerry in War of the Whiskers - 	Tom Cat, Butch, Spike, Eagle, Robot Cat, Monster Jerry
 Two Point Hospital - Radio Announcer

Television commercials 
 Doctor Who – Various UK ads
 Cookie Crisp – Voice of Chip the Wolf (most recent Nestle animated mascot)
 Bounce Bounce Tigger – Voice of Tigger – Disney toy commercial / Ravensburger
 Orange – Mobile phone national TV campaign
 New Super Mario Bros. Wii
 Peter Kay - The Sound of Laughter – US movie trailer voice
 Ben 10 - Ultimate Alien Cosmic Destruction Computer Game
 Scooby-Doo - Mystery Mansion – Voice of Scooby & Shaggy
 Scooby-Doo - Rumble & Roll – Voice of Shaggy
 Coronation Street – Cadbury and Harveys sponsorships
 Walt Disney World Resort - USA (Magic Kingdom / EPCOT / Animal Kingdom / Disney Studios)

Radio 
 The Stephen Nolan Show – BBC Radio Ulster
 FM104 Dublin – Station voiceover

References

External links 
  
 
 Official YouTube channel
 
 Words with Marc Silk: The Voice of Roller Rally

Living people
20th-century English male actors
21st-century English male actors
English male video game actors
English male voice actors
Male actors from Warwickshire
Walt Disney Animation Studios people
Year of birth missing (living people)